The North Launceston Football Club, nicknamed The Bombers, is an Australian rules football club based in Launceston, Tasmania. Australia. Since 2009 they have played in the newly formed Tasmanian State League.

History

The club started as "Railway Football Club" in 1893 and were known as "Essendon" in the 1898 season. It fielded a team in the NTFA Junior Competition for three years, and began playing in the senior competition in 1896.

Its first season under the North Launceston name was in 1899 when it played in the Northern Tasmanian Football Association.

The club has remained in the top tier of state competition ever since, playing in the Tasmanian Football League and Northern Tasmanian Football League upon the competition restructures in the state. The club won the Tasmanian State Premiership in 1905 and 1906 (both unofficial), 1947, 1949, 1950, 1995 and 1998.

The club accepted an invitation to join the new Tasmanian State League that commenced in 2009. Since 2014, the club has been a dominant force in the league, reaching every Grand Final between 2014 and 2021 for five premierships: 2014, 2015, 2017, 2018 and 2019.

Honours
 Tasmanian Football League (7): 1995, 1998, 2014, 2015, 2017, 2018, 2019
 Tasmanian State Premiership (3): 1947, 1949, 1950

Notes

Senior coaches

References

Australian rules football clubs in Tasmania
1893 establishments in Australia
Australian rules football clubs established in 1893
Sport in Launceston, Tasmania
Tasmanian Football League clubs
North West Football League clubs